The 2009 Allan Cup was the Canadian championship of senior ice hockey.  This tournament marked the 101st year that the Allan Cup has been awarded.  The 2009 tournament was hosted by the City of Steinbach, Manitoba and the Steinbach North Stars.  The tournament began on April 13, 2009, and ended April 18, 2009.  All games were played at the T.G. Smith Centre.

In the final, the Bentley Generals won their first ever Allan Cup, defeated the Southeast Prairie Thunder 4–3 in double overtime.

Information
Both Quebec and the Maritime Provinces were not represented at the 2009 Allan Cup.  It was the second consecutive year that the Maritimes had been unable to muster together a Senior "AAA" club.  Quebec missed the tournament for the first time in recent history due to their only major Senior league being on hiatus that season.

A new regional grouping was added for 2009, as Northern Ontario was represented by the Thunder Bay Twins who defeated the Kenora Thistles 2-games-to-1.  The Southern Ontario region was represented by the Dundas Real McCoys, winner of Major League Hockey, the only league to fully be taking part in this year's Allan Cup.

This years Allan Cup also featured a rare scenario where the host venue happened to be the home arena for two competing teams.  While the Steinbach North Stars were the host team, the Southeast Prairie Thunder also earned a berth in the Allan Cup by defeating the Selkirk Rivermen in provincial playdowns.  Saskatchewan was a battle between the 2007 Allan Cup champion Lloydminster Border Kings and the Weyburn Devils, won by Lloydminster.

The Alberta champions, Bentley Generals, defeated the Fort St. John Flyers, the only team registered in British Columbia, to win the McKenzie Cup and the Pacific seed.

Teams
Steinbach North Stars (Host)
Formerly the Île-des-Chênes North Stars.
Won 2003 Allan Cup.
19-2-1-1 exhibition schedule.
Bentley Generals (Alberta/British Columbia)
Defeated Fort St. John Flyers 3-games-to-1 to win the McKenzie Cup and qualify.
23-1-0-0 Chinook Hockey League Record.
Finalists at 2008 Allan Cup.
Dundas Real McCoys (Southern Ontario)
Hosted 2003 Allan Cup.
19-7-1-1 Major League Hockey record.
Defeated Whitby Dunlops 4-games-to-none to qualify.
Lloydminster Border Kings (Saskatchewan)
10-12-0-2 Chinook Hockey League record.
Won 2007 Allan Cup.
Defeated Weyburn Devils 3-games-to-none to qualify.
Southeast Prairie Thunder (Manitoba)
Formerly the Grunthal Red Wings.
12-3-1-0 exhibition schedule.
Defeated Selkirk Rivermen 4-games-to-none to qualify.
Thunder Bay Twins (Northern Ontario)
Formerly the Thunder Bay Bombers.
First appearance since winning 2005 Allan Cup.
Defeated Kenora Thistles 2-games-to-1 to qualify.

Round robin

Results

Championship Round

Quarter and Semi-finals

Final

References

External links

Administration
Allancup2009.ca, Official 2009 Allan Cup event website
Allancup.ca , Official Allan Cup website
Hockeycanada.ca, Official Hockey Canada website

Teams
Allancup2009.ca, Steinbach North Stars/2009
Tommyhockey.com, Hockey Thunder Bay website
Se-prairiehunder.com, South East Prairie Thunder website
Lloydminsterborderkings.ca, Official Lloyd Minster Border Kings website

Leagues
Majorleaguehockey.ca, Official Major League Hockey website
Chinookhockeyleague.com, Official Chinook Hockey League website

Allan Cup
Allan Cup
Allan Cup 2009
Allan Cup 2009
2009 in Manitoba